Harriot Kezia Hunt (November 9, 1805January 2, 1875) was an early female physician and women's rights activist. She spoke at the first National Women's Rights Conventions, held in 1850 in Worcester, Massachusetts.

Early life 
Hunt was born in Boston, Massachusetts, in 1805, the daughter of Joab Hunt and Kezia Wentworth Hunt. She was educated at home by her parents. Hunt's father died in 1827, leaving the family without financial support.  Harriot Hunt and her sister, Sarah Hunt, opened a private school in their home in order to be self-sufficient. Though teaching brought in money, Hunt felt it was not what she wanted to do with her life. Hunt's sister soon fell ill and was unable to recover with the treatment offered by conventional doctors. Dr. Richard Dixon Mott was invited to treat Sarah. It was after this that Hunt began studying medicine under Elizabeth Mott and Dr. Mott in 1833. Rather than using the common methods of the time, Mr. and Mrs. Mott used rest and relaxation as well as herbal remedies to help strengthen and cure patients. Hunt benefited greatly through clinical observation while working with Elizabeth Mott, who generally oversaw most of Dr. Mott's female patients. In 1835 Hunt opened her own consulting room, without a medical diploma.

Education and practice 
Hunt was the first woman to apply to Harvard Medical School in 1847. Dr. Oliver Wendell Holmes Sr. had recently been made Dean of the school and initially considered accepting her application. He was heavily criticized by the all-male student body as well as the university overseers and other faculty members, and she was asked to withdraw her application. Shortly after Elizabeth Blackwell's graduation from Geneva College in 1849, Hunt applied again to Harvard, but was denied. In the years following Hunt's application and denial, other women continued to be denied as well. It wasn't until 1945 that Harvard Medical School admitted its first class of women in a 10-year trial to measure productivity and accomplishment of women both during and after medical schooling. This class of women was admitted due to the decreased amount of qualified male applicants as a result of World War II. Despite not being accepted to Harvard after her second application, Hunt continued to practice medicine on her own. She became so widely known that in 1853 she received an Honorary MD from the Female Medical College of Pennsylvania.

Hunt was criticized throughout her years of medical practice, particularly from those who believed her profession was unsuitable for traditional femininity of the era. One New York Times article in 1858, for example, chided her for being "one of the dozen women in the United States who pine because Nature did not make them men". Conversely, Hunt believed that femininity made women especially suited for the medical profession. As she asked, "What could be more delicately feminine, more truly womanly, than to take the hand of a sister, afflicted in body and mind, and to show her the cause of her diseases?"

Hunt also worked passionately advocating for the right of women to both learn and practice medicine and, more generally, to be educated and seek professions. She believed she was living in an "age of transition", as she called it, where people were beginning to question societal traditions. In 1843, Hunt founded the Ladies In Physiology Society. She gave lectures on physiology and hygiene. In 1850 she attended the National Women's Rights Convention in Worcester, Massachusetts. For a number of years, Hunt spent her time lecturing on the abolition of slavery as well as women's rights. Much of her career is described in her memoirs, Glances and Glimpses; or, Fifty Years' Social, Including Twenty Years' Professional Life (Boston: J.P. Jewett and Company, 1856).

In 1860, she celebrated her 25 years practicing medicine with a party that drew 1500 guests, including three generations of her patients. At the event, she reportedly offered her advice to women: "I have been so happy in my work; every moment occupied; how I long to whisper it in the ear of every listless woman, 'do something, if you would be happy'".

Death and legacy 

After her death in Boston, 1875, at the age of 70, she was buried in Mount Auburn Cemetery, near Boston. Her grave can still be visited today and is marked by a statue of the Greek goddess of health, Hygeia. This was carved by the African American sculptor, Edmonia Lewis. Hunt is also commemorated on the Salem Women's Heritage Trail.

References

Further reading

External links

Harriet Kezi Hunt at History of American Women, by Maggie McLean

1805 births
1875 deaths
Physicians from Massachusetts
People from Boston
Burials at Mount Auburn Cemetery
Woman's Medical College of Pennsylvania alumni
19th-century American women physicians
19th-century American physicians
American women's rights activists
Activists from Massachusetts
Geneva College alumni